The Saudi Contractors Authority is an organ of Saudi Arabia's Ministry of Commerce which is concerned with the country's construction sector. Established in 2015 through a resolution of the Council of Ministers, it aims to create a secure environment for national and foreign business contractors in Saudi Arabia.

Background

The SCA was established through the Council of Ministers of Saudi Arabia Resolution No. 510 dated 23/11/1436(Hijri). 
SCA's coordination and early functioning was led by the Saudi Ministry of Commerce and Investment

According to SCA's official website,

Contractors' obligation

The Saudi Ministry of Finance has made obligatory for contractors and agencies to seek registration of their firms in the Saudi Contractors Authority if they want to receive a government sponsored projects or contracts.

References

Government agencies of Saudi Arabia
2015 establishments in Saudi Arabia
Government agencies established in 2015
Organisations based in Riyadh